Tasha Viets-VanLear, better known as just Tasha, is an American musician from Chicago.

Early life
Tasha was born and raised in the Albany Park neighborhood of Chicago. Tasha grew up involved in theater and poetry. Tasha attended Northside College Preparatory High School as well as St. Olaf College. After moving back to Chicago after college, Tasha worked for Black Youth Project 100.

Career
Tasha released her first EP in 2016 titled Divine Love. The EP is described as being about both "political activism and self-love". In 2018, Tasha announced plans to release her debut full-length album, and shared the new song "Kind of Love". Tasha also shared a new song titled "New Place" prior to releasing the record. The album, titled Alone at Last, was released in 2018 through Father/Daughter Records.

In April 2020, Tasha shared a new song titled "But There's Still The Moon".

Tasha's second full-length album, Tell Me What You Miss the Most, was released on November 5, 2021.

Discography

Studio albums
Alone at Last (2018)
Tell Me What You Miss the Most (2021)

EPs
Divine Love (2016)

References

Living people
Musicians from Chicago
Year of birth missing (living people)